The Museum of Ottoman House is a historic house museum in Bursa, Turkey.

The building dates back to the 17th century. Before its construction there was probably a mansion of  the Ottoman sultan Murat II (r 1421–1451) where his son Mehmet II (r.1451–1481) was born. The building was opened in 1958 as a house museum. In 1973 and 1992 it underwent restoration.

The wooden house is a two-story building with a basement. Entrance to the basement is at north and to the ground floor is at west. In the ground floor, there are a wide hall with two symmetrical rooms in each side. In the upper floor, there are a harem room, a dining room and a guest room.

The two tombac candelabras stolen from Bursa Ottoman House were put up for sale in an auction in Sotheby’s in 1989. But they returned home in 1991.

References

17th-century establishments in the Ottoman Empire
Buildings and structures of the Ottoman Empire
Historic house museums in Turkey
Ottoman architecture in Bursa
Museums established in 1958
Ottoman
Osmangazi